Anguilla bicolor is a species of eel in the genus Anguilla of the family Anguillidae, consisting of two subspecies.

Subspecies

 Anguilla bicolor bicolor sometimes known as the Indonesian shortfin eel.
 Anguilla bicolor pacifica sometimes known as the Indian shortfin eel.

References

Anguillidae
Near threatened animals
Freshwater fish of Sri Lanka
Fish described in 1844